Pierre Isaac Isidore Mendès France (11 January 190718 October 1982) was a French politician who served as prime minister of France for eight months from 1954 to 1955. As a member of the Radical Party, he headed a government supported by a coalition of Gaullists (RPF), moderate socialists (UDSR), Christian democrats (MRP) and liberal-conservatives (CNIP). His main priority was ending the Indochina War, which had already cost 92,000 lives, with 114,000 wounded and 28,000 captured on the French side. Public opinion polls showed that, in February 1954, only 7% of the French people wanted to continue the fight to regain Indochina out of the hands of the Communists, led by Ho Chi Minh and his Viet Minh movement. At the 1954 Geneva Conference, Mendès France negotiated a deal that gave the Viet Minh control of Vietnam north of the seventeenth parallel, and allowed him to pull out all French forces. He is considered one of the most prominent statesmen of the French Fourth Republic.

Early life
Mendès France was born on 11 January 1907 in Paris, the son of a textile merchant from Limoges. He was descended from Portuguese Jews who settled in France in the 16th century. He studied at the École des sciences politiques and the Faculty of Law of Paris, graduating with a doctorate in law and becoming the youngest member of the Paris bar association in 1926, at age 19. In 1924, Mendès France joined the Radical Party, the traditional party of the French middle-class centre-left (not to be confused with the mainstream SFIO, often called the Socialist Party). He married Lili Cicurel, the niece of Salvator Cicurel.

Third Republic and World War II

In 1932, Mendès France was elected member of the Chamber of Deputies for the Eure department; he was the Assembly's youngest member. His ability was recognized at once, and in 1938 the government of Léon Blum appointed him Under Secretary of State for Finance. After the surrender of France to Nazi Germany in World War II, he fled to French North Africa with other army and air force units, but was arrested by the Vichy government authorities and imprisoned for desertion. He escaped and succeeded in reaching Britain, where he joined the Free French forces led by Charles de Gaulle. Mendès France later described his trial, conviction and subsequent escape in the famous documentary The Sorrow and the Pity.

During the latter years of the war, Mendès France served in the Free French Air Forces and flew in a dozen bombing raids. After the Liberation of Paris in August 1944, he was appointed Minister for National Economy in the French provisional government by de Gaulle. He later headed the French delegation to the 1944 United Nations Monetary and Financial Conference at Bretton Woods.

Mendès France soon fell out with the Finance Minister, René Pleven. Mendès France supported state regulation of wages and prices to control inflation, while Pleven favoured generally laissez-faire policies. When de Gaulle sided with Pleven, Mendès France resigned. Nonetheless, de Gaulle valued Mendès France's abilities, and appointed him as a director of the International Bank for Reconstruction and Development, and as French representative to the United Nations Economic and Social Council.

Fourth Republic

In 1947, after democratic French politics resumed under the Fourth Republic, Mendès France was re-elected to the National Assembly. He first tried to form a government in June 1953, but was unable to gain the numbers in the Assembly. From 1950 he had been a consistent opponent of French colonialism, and by 1954 France was becoming hopelessly embroiled in major colonial conflicts: the First Indochina War and the Algerian War of Independence. When French forces were defeated by the Vietnamese Communists at Dien Bien Phu in June 1954, the government of Joseph Laniel resigned, and Mendès France formed a government with support from the centre-right.

Mendès France immediately negotiated an agreement with Ho Chi Minh, the Vietnamese Communist leader. There was, he said, no choice but total withdrawal from Indochina, and the Assembly supported him by 471 votes to 14. Nevertheless, nationalist opinion was shocked, and Roman Catholic opinion opposed abandoning the Vietnamese believers to Communism. A tirade of abuse, much of it anti-Semitic, was directed at Mendès France. Jean-Marie Le Pen, then a Poujadist member of the Assembly, described his "patriotic, almost physical repulsion" for Mendès France.

Undeterred, Mendès France next came to an agreement with Habib Bourguiba, the nationalist leader in Tunisia, for the independence of that colony by 1956, and began discussions with the nationalist leaders in Morocco for a French withdrawal. He also favoured concessions to the nationalists in Algeria; but the presence of a million Pied-noirs there left the colonial power no easy way to extricate itself from that situation. The future mercenary Bob Denard was convicted in 1954 and sentenced to fourteen months in prison for an assassination attempt against Mendès France.

Mendès France hoped that the Radical Party would become the party of modernization and renewal in French politics, replacing the SFIO. An advocate of greater European integration, he helped bring about the formation of the Western European Union, and proposed far-reaching economic reform. He also favoured defence co-operation with other European countries, but the National Assembly rejected the proposal for a European Defence Community, mainly because of misgivings about Germany's participation.

His cabinet fell in February 1955. In 1956 he served as Minister of State in the cabinet headed by the SFIO leader Guy Mollet, but resigned over Mollet's handling of the Algerian War, which was coming to dominate French politics. His split over Algeria with Edgar Faure, leader of the conservative wing of the Radical Party, led to Mendès France resigning as party leader in 1957.

Fifth Republic

Like most of the French left, Mendès France opposed de Gaulle's seizure of power in May 1958, when the mounting crisis in Algeria brought about a breakdown in the Fourth Republic system and the creation of a Fifth Republic. He led the Union of Democratic Forces, an anti-Gaullist group, but in the November 1958 elections he lost his seat in the Assembly. After being expelled from the Radical Party, whose majority faction supported de Gaulle, in late 1959 he joined the Autonomous Socialist Party (PSA), a breakaway group from the SFIO.

In April 1960, the PSA merged with several other groups to form the Unified Socialist Party (PSU). He made an unsuccessful bid to regain his seat in the National Assembly representing Eure in the 1962 election.

In 1967 he returned to the Assembly as a PSU member for the Isère, but again lost his seat in the 1968 landslide election victory of the Gaullist party UDR. Mendès France and the PSU expressed sympathy for the sentiments and actions of the student rioters during the events of May 1968, a position unusual for a politician of his age and status. One year later, Pompidou's socialist opponent in the presidential election of 1969, Gaston Defferre of the SFIO, designated him his preferred Prime Minister prior to the election. The two campaigned together in what was the first – and so far only – dual "ticket" in a French presidential election. Defferre gained only 5% of the vote and was eliminated in the election's first round. When François Mitterrand formed a new Socialist Party in 1971, Mendès France supported him, but did not attempt another political comeback. He lived long enough to see Mitterrand elected president.

Political career
Governmental function
President of the Council of Ministers : 1954–1955.
Minister of Foreign Affairs : 1954–1955.
Minister of State : January–May 1956 (Resignation).

Electoral mandates
National Assembly of France
Member of the National Assembly of France for Eure : 1932–1942 (Deposition by Philippe Pétain) / 1946–1958. Elected in 1932, reelected in 1936, 1946, 1951, 1956.
Member of the National Assembly of France for Isère (2nd constituency) : 1967–1968. Elected in 1968.

General Council
President of the General Council of Eure : 1951–1958. Reelected in 1955. 
General councillor of Eure : 1937–1958. Reelected in 1945, 1951.

Municipal council
Mayor of Louviers : 1935–1939 (Resignation) / 1953–1958 (Resignation). Reelected in 1953.
Municipal councillor of Louviers : 1935–1939 (Resignation) / 1953–1958 (Resignation). Reelected in 1953.

Mendès France's first Ministry, 19 June 1954 – 20 January 1955 

 Pierre Mendès France – President of the Council and Minister of Foreign Affairs
 Marie Pierre Koenig – Minister of National Defense and Armed Forces
 François Mitterrand – Minister of the Interior
 Edgar Faure – Minister of Finance, Economic Affairs, and Planning
 Maurice Bourgès-Maunoury – Minister of Commerce and Industry
 Eugène Claudius-Petit – Minister of Labour and Social Security
 Émile Hugues – Minister of Justice
 Jean Berthoin – Minister of National Education
Emmanuel Temple – Minister of Veterans and War Victims
 Roger Houdet – Minister of Agriculture
 Robert Buron – Minister of Overseas France
 Jacques Chaban-Delmas – Minister of Public Works, Transport, and Tourism
 Louis Aujoulat – Minister of Public Health and Population
Maurice Lemaire – Minister of Reconstruction and Housing
 Christian Fouchet – Minister of Moroccan and Tunisian Affairs
 Guy La Chambre – Minister of Relations with Partner States

Changes
14 August 1954 – Emmanuel Temple succeeds Koenig as Minister of National Defense and Armed Forces. Maurice Bourgès-Maunoury succeeds Chaban-Delmas as interim Minister of Public Works, Transport, and Tourism. Eugène Claudius-Petit succeeds Lemaire as interim Minister of Reconstruction and Housing.
3 September 1954 – Jean Masson succeeds Temple as Minister of Veterans and War Victims. Jean-Michel Guérin de Beaumont succeeds Hugues as Minister of Justice. Henri Ulver succeeds Bourgès-Maunoury as Minister of Commerce and Industry. Jacques Chaban-Delmas succeeds Bourgès-Maunoury as Minister of Public Works, Transport, and Tourism and Claudius-Petit as Minister of Reconstruction and Housing. Louis Aujoulat succeeds Claudius-Petit as Minister of Labour and Social Security. André Monteil succeeds Aujoulat as Minister of Public Health and Population.
12 November 1954 – Maurice Lemaire succeeds Chaban-Delmas as Minister of Reconstruction and Housing.

Mendès France's second Ministry, 20 January 1955 – 23 February 1955 

 Pierre Mendès France – President of the Council and Minister of Foreign Affairs
 Edgar Faure – Minister of Foreign Affairs
 Jacques Chevallier – Minister of National Defense
 Maurice Bourgès-Maunoury – Minister of Armed Forces
 François Mitterrand – Minister of the Interior
 Robert Buron – Minister of Finance, Economic Affairs, and Planning
 Henri Ulver – Minister of Commerce and Industry
 Louis Aujoulat – Minister of Labor and Social Security
 Emmanuel Temple – Minister of Justice
 Raymond Schmittlein – Minister of Merchant Marine
 Jean Berthoin – Minister of National Education
 Jean Masson – Minister of Veterans and War Victims
 Roger Houdet – Minister of Agriculture
 Jean-Jacques Juglas – Minister of Overseas France
 Jacques Chaban-Delmas – Minister of Public Works, Transport, and Tourism
 André Monteil – Minister of Public Health and Population
 Maurice Lemaire – Minister of Reconstruction and Housing
 Christian Fouchet – Minister of Moroccan and Tunisian Affairs
 Guy La Chambre – Minister of Relations with Partner States

Honours

National honours 
 Commander of the Legion of Honour
 Croix de Guerre 1939–1945
 Resistance Medal

Foreign honours

 : Grand Officer of the Order of Leopold (Belgium)
 : Grand Cordon of the Order of Ouissam Alaouite
 : Gran Cross of the Order of Saint-Charles
 : Grand Cordon of the Order of Glory (Tunisia)

Notes

References

Further reading

Aussaresses, Paul. The Battle of the Casbah: Terrorism and Counter-Terrorism in Algeria, 1955–1957. (New York: Enigma Books, 2010) .
 De Tarr, Francis. The French Radical Party: From Herriot to Mendès-France (Greenwood, 1980).
 Lacouture, Jean. Pierre Mendes France (English ed. 1984), scholarly biography. online
Alexander Werth, The Strange History of Pierre Mendès France and the Great Conflict over French North Africa. Barrie. London 1957  online
 Wilsford, David, ed. Political leaders of contemporary Western Europe: a biographical dictionary (Greenwood, 1995) pp. 313–18

External links
 

1907 births
1982 deaths
Politicians from Paris
Jewish French politicians
20th-century French Sephardi Jews
French Freemasons
French people of Portuguese-Jewish descent
Free French Air Forces officers
Radical Party (France) politicians
Unified Socialist Party (France) politicians
Prime Ministers of France
French Foreign Ministers
French Ministers of Finance
Government ministers of France
Members of the 15th Chamber of Deputies of the French Third Republic
Members of the 16th Chamber of Deputies of the French Third Republic
Members of the Constituent Assembly of France (1946)
Deputies of the 1st National Assembly of the French Fourth Republic
Deputies of the 2nd National Assembly of the French Fourth Republic
Deputies of the 3rd National Assembly of the French Fourth Republic
Deputies of the 3rd National Assembly of the French Fifth Republic
Bretton Woods Conference delegates
Jewish prime ministers
Jewish socialists
Sciences Po alumni
University of Paris alumni
French military personnel of World War II
People of the First Indochina War
French people of the Algerian War